Addigera  is a village in the southern state of Karnataka, India. It is located in the Haliyal taluk of Uttara Kannada district.

See also
 Districts of Karnataka

References

External links
 

Villages in Uttara Kannada district